The Real Wedding Crashers was an American prank/hidden camera series on NBC, inspired by the 2005 comedy film Wedding Crashers, that premiered on April 23, 2007. Ashton Kutcher, who helped create the concept, has explored a similar idea in Punk'd.

The series was produced by the aforementioned Ashton Kutcher, Karey Burke, Rich Meehan, Jon Kroll, Jim Rosenthal, and Jason Goldberg with RDF USA, the production company of shows such as Wife Swap, in association with New Line Television, part of the studio that produced the film.  No one among the show's main cast and crew were involved in the original film, nor were the cast and crew of the film involved with the series.

It was announced on May 7, 2007, that the series would be pulled after three episodes. NBC subsequently announced on its website that a fourth episode would air on May 28, 2007. NBC announced on July 20, 2007 that the show was not renewed. The two episodes not aired on NBC (along with those that did) have subsequently aired on the Style Network.

Episodes

Series cast
Ben Gleib
Steve Byrne
Catherine Reitman
Gareth Reynolds
Desi Lydic

Notable guest star
Robin Bain

References

External links
 
 

2007 American television series debuts
2007 American television series endings
2000s American reality television series
Television series by New Line Television
Wedding television shows